Safari is a 1991 TV film directed by Roger Vadim.

External links
Safari at IMDb

French television films
1990s French films